Henry Pierson may refer to:

 Henry Hugh Pierson (1815–1873), English composer
 Henry R. Pierson (1819–1890), American lawyer and politician